Warmiqucha (Quechua warmi woman, wife, qucha lake, "woman's lake", Hispanicized spelling Huarmicocha) is a lake in Peru located in the Cusco Region, Chumbivilcas Province, Velille District. Warmiqucha lies northeast of the larger lakes named Urququcha and  Khirkiqucha.

References 

Lakes of Peru
Lakes of Cusco Region